Wellington Road (and Meechi Road at its south-eastern end) is a South Australian secondary road, connecting Mount Barker with the towns of Wistow, Highland Valley, Woodchester and  Langhorne Creek. Its north-western portion has been designated part of route B37.

History
Wellington Road previously served as an early alignment of the Princes Highway some time after it was first declared in South Australia in February 1922, initially defined along the route via now known as Strathalbyn Road from Adelaide via Aldgate, Mylor, Macclesfield, Strathalbyn, Langhorne Creek, crossing the Murray River at Wellington and then continuing along the present route beyond Meningie, By 1928, the route was re-aligned to run through Mount Barker and along Wellington Road via Wistow and Woodchester to Langhorne Creek, although by 1935 this alignment was changed to run via Nairne, Kanmantoo, Murray Bridge and Tailem Bend (along what is now known as the Old Princes Highway).

Major intersections

References

See also

Roads in South Australia